Royal Air Force Drem or RAF Drem is a former Royal Air Force station, just north of the village of Drem in East Lothian, Scotland. The motto of the station was Exiit Hinc Lumen which means "Light has departed from this place".

History
The foundation of Drem as an airfield, precedes the creation of the Royal Air Force (RAF) as by 1916, an airfield had been established under the name West Fenton Aerodrome. From 1916 to 1917, No. 77 Home Defence Squadron, Royal Flying Corps operated from Drem and in April 1918, No. 2 Training Depot Station opened.

Between April and 14 August 1918, the American 41st Aero Squadron under the command of Lieutenant Warren C. Woodward was temporarily located at Drem together with an aero repair flight company. The Americans called the airfield "Gullane" in its official history. The squadron transferred to St Maixent in France and arrived at its operational airfield of Romorantin on 29 August 1918.

By November 1918, West Fenton had been renamed Gullane Aerodrome and with the post-war demobilisation the airfield was vacated in 1919. From 1933 to 1939, the airfield saw only occasional use by visiting squadrons.

It was at this time, while stationed there in 1934, that Victor Goddard had his paranormal vision of the airfield as it might appear in the then future 1939.

In 1939, the grass airstrip was resurfaced, and the unit was renamed RAF Drem. The station was then home to No. 13 Flying Training School.

Following the outbreak of the Second World War, RAF Drem became an air defence fighter unit for the city of Edinburgh and the shipping area around the Firth of Forth, with Supermarine Spitfire of 602 Squadron posted to Drem.

On 16 October 1939, the Luftwaffe made its first attack on Great Britain. Junkers Ju 88s of 1/KG 30 led by Hauptmann Helmuth Pohle attacked British warships in the Firth of Forth. Spitfires from 603 Squadron (City of Edinburgh Squadron) joined 602 Squadron aircraft in a defensive counter-air sortie. Following the destruction of a Luftwaffe bomber aircraft by a 603 Squadron Spitfire, 602 Squadron pilot Flight Lieutenant George Pinkerton gained the second kill of the Second World War.

In 1940, an airfield lighting system for night landings, the Drem Lighting System, was developed at RAF Drem.

Royal Australian Air Force 453 Squadron was re-established at Drem on 18 June 1942, equipped with Supermarine Spitfire aircraft, and joined the RAF's Fighter Command.

In 1942, Royal Navy personnel were posted to RAF Drem and in 1945 the unit was handed over to the Admiralty and renamed HMS Nighthawk. On 15 March 1946, the unit was returned to the Air Ministry although it was closed and then decommissioned not long after that.

Units and aircraft

(Sources:)

The following units were here at some point:
 No. 2882 Squadron RAF Regiment
 No. 2885 Squadron RAF Regiment
 Radio Development Flight RAF (December 1942 - July 1943) became No. 1692 Flight
 SCR 584 Training Unit RAF (January - May 1945)

Most of the units based at Drem during the Second World War were fighter or night-fighter squadrons, which were often based at Drem for relatively short periods.  This was typical of many fighter stations in Scotland and Northern England as although Luftwaffe activity in these areas was relatively limited for most of the war, they still required to be defended.  Squadrons would therefore be rotated north to cover "quiet" sectors whilst also resting, absorbing replacement aircrews and/or converting to new aircraft.  As the war progressed the Luftwaffe threat to Britain diminished further and surplus fighter stations could be transferred to other uses, such as (in the case of Drem) training of Fleet Air Arm crews.

In addition to the units and dates listed above, Drem also hosted detachments from various other RAF squadrons from time to time. These were mostly fighter and night-fighter units, but detachments from 278 or 281 (Air-Sea Rescue) Squadrons were also present for extended periods during 1942 and 1943.

Current use
At present, the RAF Drem Museum is housed in what was RAF Drem's mess accommodation.

Various business premises occupy the rest of the accommodation section of the airfield.

Equestrian activities occupy areas of the greater airfield.

A radio controlled model flying club have a strip on the southern edge of the field just off the peritrack.

References

Citations

Bibliography

External links

RAF Drem Museum website
Photographs Of RAF Drem.

Royal Air Force stations in Scotland
Royal Air Force stations of World War II in the United Kingdom
Defunct airports in Scotland
Airports established in 1917